YMCA is a historic YMCA located in downtown Evansville, Indiana. It was built in 1924, and is a five-story, Tudor Revival style yellow brick clubhouse on a raised basement.  It features terra cotta detailing.

It was listed on the National Register of Historic Places in 1982.

References

YMCA buildings in the United States
Clubhouses on the National Register of Historic Places in Indiana
Tudor Revival architecture in Indiana
Buildings and structures completed in 1924
Buildings and structures in Evansville, Indiana
National Register of Historic Places in Evansville, Indiana
1924 establishments in Indiana